Andracantha is a genus of parasitic worms belonging to the family Polymorphidae.

The species of this genus are found in Northern America.

Species:

Andracantha baylisi 
Andracantha clavata 
Andracantha gravida 
Andracantha leucocarboi 
Andracantha mergi 
Andracantha phalacrocoracis 
Andracantha sigma 
Andracantha tandemtesticulata 
Andracantha tunitae

References

Polymorphidae
Acanthocephala genera